Richard Cobbing (born 15 October 1967) is a British freestyle skier. He competed in the men's aerials event at the 1994 Winter Olympics.

References

External links
 

1967 births
Living people
British male freestyle skiers
Olympic freestyle skiers of Great Britain
Freestyle skiers at the 1994 Winter Olympics
Sportspeople from Newcastle upon Tyne
British male trampolinists
20th-century British people